The Colorado chipmunk (Neotamias quadrivittatus) is a species of chipmunk in the squirrel family Sciuridae. It is endemic to Colorado, Utah, Arizona and New Mexico in the United States.

Description

It can be found most often in coniferous forests, woodlands, montane shrub lands, and alpine tundra habitats. This means that in elevation, T. quadrivittatus inhabits anywhere above  and below  elevation.

This western American dweller is the largest of the three species of chipmunks found in the Colorado Front Range (which also include the Least Chipmunk and the Uinta Chipmunk). Chipmunks are distinguished from ground squirrels in that their faces have a stripe going across under the eye. There are no dimorphic differences between males and females.

Their vocalizations are essential for defending their territories.

Diet
Their diet consists of seeds, berries, flowers and insects. They like to collect food in the fall and cache it for the winter.

Reproduction
Depending on the elevation at which the chipmunk is found, it may range from 1-2 litters. Most commonly copulation occurs in the spring when the chipmunks emerge from their burrows. The females are only receptive of males for a couple of days after emerging from the burrow. About a month after copulation, the female will give birth to a litter that may have anywhere between 5-8 altricial young. Within 40–50 days they will be weaned from their mother.

References

Further reading

Mammals of the United States
Neotamias
Mammals described in 1823
Taxonomy articles created by Polbot